Bukit Gombak is a subzone of Bukit Batok, Singapore. It is a hilly neighbourhood in the west-central area of the Southeast Asian city-state of Singapore. In the Malay language, bukit means hill and gombak a bunch or collection of something. The neighbourhood consists of two hills. One of them stands at 133m while the other stands at 113m. They are Singapore's second and third highest natural point after Bukit Timah Hill.

Bukit Gombak is bounded by Bukit Batok Road, West Avenue 5, the North side of Bukit Gombak Sports Complex, West and North side of Town Park, the North-West and North side of the landed housing estate along Hillview Avenue, Upper Bukit Timah Road and Choa Chu Kang Road. It is generally regarded as the area around the elevated Mass Rapid Transit (MRT) train station of the same name (NS3), including the hills to the east of the station and HDB apartment blocks along Bukit Batok West Avenue 5 and East Avenue 5. The Tower Transit feeder bus service 945 from the Bukit Batok bus interchange plies the general area.

Neighbouring Areas

Places

 Singapore's Ministry of Defence headquarters
 Bukit Gombak Stadium
 Bukit Gombak Sports Hall
 Zu-Lin Temple Association
 Grace Assembly of God Church
 Bukit Batok Town Park
 Little Guilin
 Lianhua Primary School
 St Anthony's Primary School
 Hillgrove Secondary School
 Swiss Cottage Secondary School
 Guilin View Condominium
 The Madeira Condominium

Politics
Bukit Gombak was a single-member constituency in the Singapore general elections in 1988, 1991 and 1997. In 1988, the ruling party People's Action Party candidate Dr. Seet Ai Mee defeated the Singapore Democratic Party candidate Ling How Doong by winning 53.5% of the vote. In 1991, Bukit Gombak became one of only four constituencies held by the opposition when Ling won 51.4% of the votes to Seet's 48.6%. In 1997 Ling lost his seat to the PAP's Ang Mong Seng by over 30% of the vote and Bukit Gombak returned to PAP control.

In the redrawing of electoral boundaries in 2001, shortly before general elections were held, the area was subsumed under the five-member Hong Kah Group Representation Constituency. The PAP slate comprising Yeo Cheow Tong, John Chen Seow Phun, Ahmad Khalis bin Abdul Ghani, Ang Mong Seng and Amy Khor Lean Suan defeated the Singapore Democratic Party with 79.7% of the vote. The PAP won the GRC in a walkover in the 2006 general election with Alvin Yeo and Zaqy Mohamad as new candidates replacing John Chen and Ahmad Khalis. Ang Mong Seng remained as representative for Bukit Gombak. A smallest portion of Bukit Gombak was also subsumed under the five-member Jurong GRC, with Halimah Yacob as the MP for Bukit Batok East, until 2015.

Following Hong Kah GRC's dissolution and the 2011 general elections, Bukit Gombak became part of Chua Chu Kang Group Representation Constituency contested by the PAP slate comprising Gan Kim Yong (former member for Chua Chu Kang Single Member Constituency), Alvin Yeo, Zaqy Mohamad and new candidates Low Yen Ling and Alex Yam Ziming. They defeated a team from the National Solidarity Party led by Tony Tan Lay Thiam and Hazel Poa by 61.2% to 38.8%.

Minister of State Low Yen Ling represents the Bukit Gombak division within Chua Chu Kang GRC following Ang Mong Seng's retirement in 2011. This division includes Housing and Development Board apartment blocks near the Bukit Gombak MRT station as well as the private estates and condominiums off Hillview Avenue. A small portion of Bukit Gombak is part of Jurong GRC, which Senior Parliamentary Secretary Rahayu Mahzam currently represents as the Member of Parliament for the Bukit Batok East Division.

References

External links
Chua Chu Kang Town Council
Jurong-Clementi Town Council
Bukit Gombak Grassroots Organisations (People's Association)
Bukit Batok Town Park (National Parks Board)

Places in Singapore
Bukit Batok